Tarring, officially West Tarring, is a neighbourhood of Worthing, in the borough of Worthing in West Sussex, England. It is called "West Tarring", or less commonly "Tarring Peverell", to differentiate it from Tarring Neville near Lewes.

History
Tarring was given by King Athelstan of England to the archbishops of Canterbury in the 10th century. At the time of the Domesday Book in 1086, the village was known as Terringes, and consisted of 50 households. It is thought that the place name means "Teorra's people", with Teorra being a Saxon settler. There is a tradition that the village was visited by Thomas Becket, the martyred archbishop, in the 12th century and also by St Richard of Chichester, patron saint of Sussex, in the 13th century.

Historically a parish, Tarring included outlying land at Marlpost in Horsham. Two ancient roads cross the parish - the Chichester—Brighton Roman road and the Broadwater—Littlehampton road, whose crossroads called Polltree was mentioned in 1418.

From 1499 a market place was recorded in Tarring, at the junction of High Street (previously North Street), South Street and Church Road (previously West Street).

West Tarring is noted for its 13th-century parish church of St Andrew, 13th-century Archbishop's Palace, numerous old houses including the 15th-century timber-framed Parsonage Row, and two pubs: The Vine and the George and Dragon.

Despite Tarring High Street being relatively short and very narrow, it was once home to five pubs and was also a route for double-decker buses. So the George and Dragon has an unusually high pub sign. A lamp case bearing the legend Castle Inn is still present outside one of the former public houses.

West Tarring had an ancient fig garden dating from 1745 or earlier; it existed at least until 1950.

Modern Tarring
West Tarring sub-post office was closed in 2004 and is now a tea room. There are three other shops: a small general stores, another tea room and a ladies' hairdresser. Once a village, Tarring has now become a commuter feeder area and suburban enclave.

Governance
Tarring lies within the borough of Worthing and mostly lies within Tarring ward, with part of the former parish within Gaisford ward. Each ward has three councillors that represent the area on Worthing Borough Council.  For elections to West Sussex County Council most of the area is represented by the Tarring electoral division.  Tarring ward is represented at Westminster by the  Worthing West constituency, while Gaisford ward is represented by the East Worthing and Shoreham constituency.

Cinema
Part of the 2022 film My Policeman, starring Harry Styles and Emma Corrin was filmed at the Vine in Tarring High Street.

Famous residents
St Richard of Chichester (1197–1253), lived here for a time after 1244, with the parish priest, Simon, while his appointment as Bishop of Chichester was disputed.
John Selden, polymath, was born here on 16 December 1584.
Edward Henty, first permanent settler of Port Phillip District (later the Colony of Victoria), was born here in 1810
James Henty, pioneer, merchant and politician in Australia, was born here on 24 September 1800.
William Henty, who bowled the first ball in the first ever first-class cricket match in Australia, was born here on 23 September 1808.
Stephen Henty, prominent on the Victorian Legislative Council in Australia, was born here on 3 November 1811.
Horace Mitchell, first-class cricketer, was born here on 19 January 1858.
Jason Lewry (born 1971), first-class cricketer, grew up here.

Gallery

References

External links

Further historical information and sources on GENUKI

Suburbs of Worthing
Market towns in West Sussex